Kamaryn is a village in the Brahin district of Belarus, near the Ukrainian town of Pripyat. Its population in 2017 was 1,777. It experienced heavy nuclear fallout during the Chernobyl disaster.

Geography
Kamaryn is on the Dnieper at the edge of a forest, near the southernmost tip of Belarus.     

Villages in Belarus
Populated places in Gomel Region
Minsk Governorate
Populated places on the Dnieper in Belarus